The Stock Exchange of Singapore (SES) was a stock exchange company in Singapore. It was formed in 1973, when the termination of currency interchangeability between Malaysia and Singapore, caused the Stock Exchange of Malaysia and Singapore (SEMS) to separate into the SES and Kuala Lumpur Stock Exchange Bhd (KLSEB).

It merged with the Singapore International Monetary Exchange (SIMEX) and the Securities Clearing and Computer Services Pte Ltd (SCCS) on 1 December 1999 to form the Singapore Exchange (SGX).

See also 
 Singapore Exchange (SGX)
 List of stock exchanges in the Commonwealth of Nations

References

1973 establishments in Singapore
Economy of Singapore
Stock exchanges in Singapore
Singapore Exchange
Defunct stock exchanges